A Woman's Work: The NFL's Cheerleader Problem is a 2019 documentary film directed by filmmaker Yu Gu. The film examines problems such as wage theft and illegal employment that are faced by cheerleaders in the National Football League.

Synopsis
The film follows the stories of two former cheerleaders; Lacy Thibodeaux-Fields, of the Los Angeles Raiderettes and Maria Pinzone, of the Buffalo Jills as they filed lawsuits against their teams for unlawful employment policies, bias, and pay discrimination.

See also 
National Football League cheerleading 
Feminism in the United States
Me Too movement 
Gender pay gap

References

External links

Cheerleaders
American documentary films
2019 films
1091 Pictures films
2010s English-language films
2010s American films